Mandroid is a 1993 film directed by Jack Ersgard starring Robert Symonds and Curt Lowens.

Plot 
In his hidden laboratory deep in Russia, Dr. Karl Zimmer (Symonds) has invented the Mandroid, a humanoid robot which follows the motions of a man in a special control suit. He has offered the invention to the United States, which has sent Agent Joe Smith and Dr. Wade Franklin from the CIA for inspection.

However, Zimmer's partner Drago (Lowens) has different plans and wants to sell Mandroid to the military, the night he tries to steal Mandroid, he becomes exposed to the highly toxic Superconn and is terribly disfigured. However, during the struggle, Zimmer's assistant Ben Knight also becomes exposed as he begins to turn invisible.

Drago enslaves a homeless mute and partially fixes his face, but the mute has to make him a metal mask. Using the Mandroid, Drago kidnaps Smith. Drago demands that Zimmer give him the Superconn in exchange for Smith.

Zimmer, Zana and Wade retrieve the Superconn, meanwhile Smith is revealed to be in cahoots with Drago. The chief of police arrives at the trade with a squad of police officers.

Through Mandroid, Drago reveals Smith's duplicity and fatally shoots Zimmer, then shoots Smith, as Zana mourns her father, the rest of them go after Drago and the Mandroid. Mandroid kills all of the police. Smith atones by killing the mute but dies from his injuries.

Wade destroys the Mandroid, Drago shoots Wades legs crippling him. Wade causes the building to collapse on him.

Wade and Zana start a relationship. Drago is revealed to be alive.

Cast 
 Brian Cousins as Wade
 Jane Caldwell as Zanna
 Michael Della Femina as Benjamin
 Robert Symonds as Karl Zimmer
 Curt Lowens as Drago
 Patrik Ersgård as Joe
 Ion Haiduc as the Mute
 Mircea Albulescu as Doctor
 Costel Constantin as Chief of Police
 Adrian Pintea as Killer
 Radu Minculescu as Policeman
 Jake McKinnon as Mandroid (uncredited)

Production
The project originally was to be called "Mindmaster". Some early concept art was done by Jack Kirby.

Reception 

Dennis Schwartz gave the film a grade C+ and wrote: "The film disappoints because the story is slight, the acting is wooden, the cheap special effects are not special and there's no pay-off."

Sequel 
A sequel, entitled Invisible: The Chronicles of Benjamin Knight followed the same year.

References

External links 
 
 
 Review of the movie at internalbleeding.net

1993 films
1993 science fiction films
American robot films
1990s English-language films
American science fiction films
1990s American films